The 1970 Vermont gubernatorial election took place on November 3, 1970. Incumbent Republican Deane C. Davis ran successfully for re-election to a second term as Governor of Vermont, defeating Democratic candidate Leo O'Brien Jr.

Republican primary

Results

Democratic primary

Results

General election

Results

References

Vermont
1970
Gubernatorial
November 1970 events in the United States